'Asabiyyah (also 'asabiyya, 'group feeling' or 'social cohesion') is a concept of social solidarity with an emphasis on unity, group consciousness, and a sense of shared purpose and social cohesion, originally used in the context of tribalism and clanism.

Asabiyya is neither necessarily nomadic nor based on blood relations; rather, it resembles a philosophy of classical republicanism. In the modern period, it is generally analogous to solidarity. However, it is often negatively associated because it can sometimes suggest nationalism or partisanship, i.e., loyalty to one's group regardless of circumstances.

The concept was familiar in the pre-Islamic era, but became popularized in Ibn Khaldun's Muqaddimah, in which it is described as the fundamental bond of human society and the basic motive force of history, pure only in its nomadic form.<ref>Ibn Khaldun. The Muqaddimah, translated by F. Rosenthal.</ref> Ibn Khaldun argued that asabiyya is cyclical and directly relevant to the rise and fall of civilizations: it is strongest at the start of a civilization, declines as the civilization advances, and then another more compelling asabiyyah eventually takes its place to help establish a different civilization.

Overview

Ibn Khaldun describes asabiyya as the bond of cohesion among humans in a group-forming community. The bond exists at any level of civilization, from nomadic society to states and empires. Asabiyyah is strongest in the nomadic phase, and decreases as civilization advances. As this declines, another more compelling asabiyyah may take its place; thus, civilizations rise and fall, and history describes these cycles as they play out.

Ibn Khaldun argued that some dynasty (or civilization) has within itself the seeds of its own downfall. He explains that ruling houses tend to emerge on the peripheries of existing empires and use the much stronger asabiyya present in their areas to their advantage, in order to bring about a change in leadership. This implies that the new rulers are at first considered 'barbarians' in comparison to the previous ones. As they establish themselves at the center of their empire, they become increasingly lax, less coordinated, disciplined and watchful, and more concerned with maintaining their new power and lifestyle. Their asabiyya dissolves into factionalism and individualism, diminishing their capacity as a political unit. Conditions are thus created wherein a new dynasty can emerge at the periphery of their control, grow strong, and effect a change in leadership, continuing the cycle. Ibn Khaldun also further states in the Muqaddimah that "dynasties have a natural life span like individuals", and that no dynasty generally lasts beyond three generations of about 40 years each.

See also

 Tribalism
 Ethnocentrism
 Historic recurrence
 Superpower collapse
Islamic philosophy

References

 Citations 

Bibliography
 
 Durkheim, Émile. [1893] 1997. The Division of Labor in Society. New York: The Free Press. 
 Gabrieli, F. 1930. Il concetto della 'asabiyyah nel pensiero storico di Ibn Khaldun, Atti della R. Accad. delle scienze di Torino, lxv
 
Ibn Khaldun. The Muqaddimah, translated by F. Rosenthal.

Further reading
 Ahmed, Akbar S. 2003. Islam under siege: living dangerously in a post-honor world. Cambridge: Polity.
Fanusie, Yaya J. 2020 November 1. "As African American Patriotism Declines, So Will America." 1776 Unites''.
 Korotayev, Andrey. 2006. Secular Cycles and Millennial Trends in Africa. Moscow: URSS.
Turchin, Peter. 2003. Historical Dynamics: Why States Rise and Fall. Princeton, NJ: Princeton University Press.

External links
 Asabiyya: Re-Interpreting Value Change in Globalized Societies

Sociological terminology
Islamic terminology
Arabic words and phrases

ar:ابن خلدون#علم الاجتماع